Pui Kiu Middle School is a secondary school in Hong Kong. Located in the Eastern District area of North Point. The school uses Chinese language as a medium of instruction.

During a portion of its history in British Hong Kong it was known as being pro-Mainland China.

History
The school was founded in 1946 by overseas Chinese investors from Southeast Asia and elsewhere, originally in Pui Kiu Lang Park (around Happy Valley to the Mid-Levels area). In the 1980s it relocated to its current location in Braemar Hill.

Controversy
When the People's Republic of China was established in 1949, the school announced that it would uphold Communist disciplines in its curriculum. This placed a severe strain on relations between the school and the colonial Hong Kong government, as well as with the local population, whose political opinion tended towards anti-communism.

In the late 1970s, the Hong Kong government, under the education laws, took over the school and reorganized it.

Present day
Currently, Pui Kiu Middle School is part of the Direct Subsidy Scheme. The campus features a swimming pool, student dormitories, laboratories, computer rooms, classrooms, an indoor dining hall, an auditorium, a library and an indoor stadium.

Notable alumni

Gary Cheng: former Legislative Councillor
Jasper Tsang Yok-sing, the founding Chairman (1992–2003) of the Democratic Alliance for the Betterment of Hong Kong (DAB), the largest pro-Beijing political party in Hong Kong. Starting in October 2008, he became President of Legislative Council
Ma Lik (1952–2007): former Legislative Councillor and former Chairman of the leftist DAB Party
To Kit: editorial writer
Yvonne Yung Hung: actress

References

External links

 

Educational institutions established in 1946
North Point
Secondary schools in Hong Kong
1946 establishments in Hong Kong
Junior secondary schools in China
Communist schools in Hong Kong
Boarding schools in Hong Kong